The Eurasian oystercatcher (Haematopus ostralegus) also known as the common pied oystercatcher, or palaearctic oystercatcher, or (in Europe) just oystercatcher, is a wader in the oystercatcher bird family Haematopodidae. It is the most widespread of the oystercatchers, with three races breeding in western Europe, central Eurosiberia, Kamchatka, China, and the western coast of Korea. No other oystercatcher occurs within this area. The extinct Canary Islands oystercatcher (Haematopus meadewaldoi), formerly considered a distinct species, may have actually been an isolated subspecies or distinct population of the Eurasian oystercatcher.

This oystercatcher is the national bird of the Faroe Islands.

Taxonomy
The Eurasian oystercatcher was listed by the Swedish naturalist Carl Linnaeus in 1758 in the tenth edition of his Systema Naturae under the binomial name Haemotopus ostralegus. The genus name Haematopus combines the Ancient Greek haima αἳμα meaning "blood" and pous πούς meaning "foot". The specific epithet ostralegus combines the Latin ostrea meaning "oyster" and legere meaning "to gather".

The name oystercatcher was coined by Mark Catesby in 1731 as a common name for the North American species H. palliatus, described as eating oysters. Yarrell in 1843 established this as the preferred term, replacing the older name Sea Pie.

Four subspecies are recognised:

 H. o. ostralegus Linnaeus, 1758 – breeds Iceland to Scandinavia and south Europe, winters in west Africa
 H. o. longipes Buturlin, 1910  –  breeds Ukraine and Turkey to central Russia and west Siberia; winters in east Africa
 H. o. buturlini Dementiev, 1941 – breeds west Kazakhstan to northwest China; winters in southwest Asia and India
 H. o. osculans Swinhoe, 1871 – breeds Kamchatka Peninsula, Korean Peninsula and northeast China; winters in east China

Description

The oystercatcher is one of the largest waders in the region. They are obvious and noisy plover-like birds, with black and white plumage, red legs and strong broad red bills used for smashing or prising open molluscs such as mussels or for finding earthworms. Despite its name, oysters do not form a large part of its diet. The bird still lives up to its name, as few if any other wading birds are capable of opening oysters at all.

This oystercatcher is unmistakable in flight, with white patches on the wings and tail, otherwise black upperparts, and white underparts. Young birds are more brown, have a white neck collar and a duller bill. The call is a distinctive loud piping.

The bill shape varies; oystercatchers with broad bill tips open molluscs by prising them apart or hammering through the shell, whereas pointed-bill birds dig up worms. Much of this is due to the wear resulting from feeding on the prey. Individual birds specialise in one technique or the other which they learn from their parents. It shows clinal variation with an increase from west to east. The subspecies longipes has distinctly brownish upperparts and the nasal groove extends more than halfway along the bill. In the subspecies ostralegus the nasal groove stops short of the half-way mark. The osculans subspecies lacks white on the shafts of the outer 2–3 primaries and has no white on the outer webs of the outer five primaries.

Distribution and migration
The oystercatcher is a migratory species over most of its range. The European population breeds mainly in northern Europe, but in winter the birds can be found in north Africa and southern parts of Europe. Although the species is present all year in Ireland, Great Britain and the adjacent European coasts, there is still migratory movement: the large flocks that are found in the estuaries of south-west England in winter mainly breed in northern England or Scotland. Similar movements are shown by the Asian populations. The birds are highly gregarious outside the breeding season.

Breeding

The nest is a bare scrape on pebbles, on the coast or on inland gravelly islands. Two to four eggs are laid. Both eggs and chicks are highly cryptic.

Status
Because of its large numbers and readily identified behaviour, the oystercatcher is an important indicator species for the health of the ecosystems where it congregates. Extensive long-term studies have been carried out on its foraging behaviour, in northern Germany, in the Netherlands and particularly on the River Exe estuary in south-west England. These studies form an important part of the foundation for the modern discipline of behavioural ecology.

Gallery

References

External links

 
 Oystercatcher WEBCAM  live from the roof of the University of Bergen
 Pirates of the Caribbean, a movie that features the bird
 
 
 
 
 Educational video about Eurasian Oystercatcher (Haematopus Ostralegus)

Eurasian oystercatcher
Birds of Eurasia
Birds of Africa
Eurasian oystercatcher
Eurasian oystercatcher
Eurasian oystercatcher